West Hancock Community School District is a rural public school district headquartered in West Hancock Elementary School in Britt, Iowa. Mostly in Hancock County with a section in Wright County, it serves the communities of Britt and Kanawha.

The elementary school and the high school are in Britt while the middle school is in Kanawha.

History
The district formed on July 1, 1994, with the merger of the Britt and Kanawha districts.

On July 1, 2015, the Corwith–Wesley Community School District dissolved, with a portion of the district being taken by West Hancock CSD.

In 2019, the district was making plans to renovate some buildings. It initially hired the Des Moines company Samuels Group as a contractor as the company had the lowest bid on a $100,000 plus margin, but the company terminated its involvement, forcing the district to find a new contractor.

Schools
The district operates three schools:
 West Hancock Elementary School, Britt
 West Hancock Middle School, Kanawha
 West Hancock High School, Britt

West Hancock High School

Athletics
The Eagles participate in the Top of Iowa Conference in the following sports:
Football
 4-time State Champions (1973 (2A), 1996 (1A), 2019 (1A), 2021 (1A))
Cross Country
Volleyball
Basketball
Bowling
Wrestling
 5-time State Champions (1961, 1962, 1971, 1972, 1973)
Golf
 Girls' 1986 Class 1A State Champions
 Boys' 1981 Class 1A State Champions
Track and Field
 Boys' 4-time state Champions (1974, 1992, 2007, 2008)
 Girls' 1996 Class 1A State Champions
Baseball
Softball

See also
List of school districts in Iowa
List of high schools in Iowa

References

External links
 West Hancock Community School District
 

Education in Hancock County, Iowa
Education in Wright County, Iowa
School districts in Iowa
1994 establishments in Iowa
School districts established in 1994